Adalberto Mejía (born June 20, 1993) is a Dominican professional baseball pitcher who is a free agent. He has previously played in Major League Baseball (MLB Minnesota Twins, St. Louis Cardinals, and Los Angeles Angels, and in the Chinese Professional Baseball League (CPBL) for the Fubon Guardians.

Professional career

San Francisco Giants 
Mejía signed as an international free agent with the San Francisco Giants. He pitched for the Augusta GreenJackets of the Class A South Atlantic League in 2012, and was named the league's Pitcher of the Week for June 18–24. He pitched for the San Jose Giants of the Class A-Advanced California League in 2013, where he had a 3.31 earned run average (ERA). The Giants assigned Mejía to the Richmond Flying Squirrels of the Class AA Eastern League in 2014, and he had a 4.67 ERA. After the season, Minor League Baseball suspended Mejía for the first fifty games of the 2015 season for testing positive for sibutramine, a banned substance. The Giants added him to their 40-man roster after the 2015 season. He began the 2016 season with the Sacramento River Cats of the Class AAA Pacific Coast League.

Minnesota Twins 
On July 28, 2016, Mejía was traded to the Minnesota Twins for Eduardo Núñez. The Twins assigned him to the Rochester Red Wings of the Class AAA International League.  The Twins promoted Mejía to the major leagues on August 20.

Mejía spent time in with the Twins and in AAA in 2017. For the year he had a 4-7 record with a 4.50 ERA, in 21 starts.

He started 2018 in Rochester, and was called up on June 29. He was placed on the disabled list on August 10, appearing only in 5 games.

Mejía started 2019 in the Twins bullpen. Mejía was placed on the injured list on May 2.

On July 13, 2019, Mejía was designated for assignment by the Twins after posting an ERA of 8.80 in 13 games.

Los Angeles Angels 
On July 20, 2019, Mejía was claimed off waivers by the Los Angeles Angels. On July 26, he was designated for assignment.

St. Louis Cardinals 
On July 30, 2019, Mejía was claimed off waivers by the St. Louis Cardinals. On August 6, Mejía was designated for assignment.

Los Angeles Angels (second stint)
On August 8, 2019, Mejía was claimed off waivers by the Los Angeles Angels. On August 20, Mejía was designated for assignment. On September 1, the Angels selected his contract. Mejia was designated for assignment on January 7, 2020. He was released on January 10.

Chicago White Sox
On January 21, 2020, Mejía signed a minor league deal with the Chicago White Sox. Mejía did not play in a game in 2020 due to the cancellation of the minor league season because of the COVID-19 pandemic. On August 24, 2020, Mejía was released by the White Sox organization.

Fubon Guardians
On May 19, 2021, Mejía signed with the Fubon Guardians of the Chinese Professional Baseball League. On July 20, Mejía made his CPBL debut against the Wei Chuan Dragons. He was released on September 29, 2021.

References

External links

 

1993 births
Living people
Augusta GreenJackets players
Dominican Republic expatriate baseball players in the United States
Dominican Summer League Giants players
Fort Myers Miracle players
Fresno Grizzlies players
Gigantes del Cibao players
Los Angeles Angels players
Major League Baseball players from the Dominican Republic
Major League Baseball pitchers
Minnesota Twins players
Pensacola Blue Wahoos players
People from Bonao
Richmond Flying Squirrels players
Rochester Red Wings players
Sacramento River Cats players
San Jose Giants players
Scottsdale Scorpions players
St. Louis Cardinals players